Metworst or droge worst ("dry sausage") is a type of traditional Dutch sausage. The sausages have a strong flavor, and are made from raw minced pork which is then air dried.

Droge worst simply means "dry sausage", referring to drying process and texture of the product. The name metworst (Met from Low German word mett, "minced pork without bacon") is similar to the German Mettwurst, though only in name, as the taste and preparation of both sausage types is very different. 

Metworst is traditionally found throughout the Netherlands and Flanders. Most of the production is the northern provinces of the Netherlands, Groningen, Friesland and Drenthe, where wind conditions are most suitable for rapidly air drying the sausages.

Finnish meetvursti resembles the Dutch metworst or salami: it is dry, hard, strong-flavored, dense, usually made of pork and eaten as a cold cut on bread. Some recipes, typically those sold as 'Russian style', include horse meat. Meetvursti sold in supermarkets will often say "may contain horse meat" as a precaution due to this. 

In Sweden, sliced medwurst sausage (boiled or smoked) is typically used on bread for breakfast.

Originally metworst, thanks to its preservability, served as an emergency meat supply to poor farmers in times of need or lack of fresh meat. As meat production gradually rose, the sausage began to be used as lunch for field laborers. 

The sausage is the direct ancestor of the better-known South African droë wors, which is near identical in its way of production, though the meat used is beef and mutton rather than pork.

See also
List of sausages

References

External links 
 

Dutch sausages
Fermented sausages